Grenda (The Hamlet) is a local Norwegian newspaper, covering events in the municipality of Kvinnherad in Hordaland county. 

Grenda is published in Nynorsk. The editorial board is based in Rosendal, and in 2005 it consisted of seven people. Its offices are located at Skålagato 36 in Rosendal. The newspaper Sunnhordland prints Grenda in Stord.

Grenda was established in 1951 by Olav Aurvold, who was later succeeded by Knut Hass as owner and editor. In turn, Hass sold the newspaper in 2000. The current editor is Håvard Sætrevik.

Circulation
According to the Norwegian Audit Bureau of Circulations and National Association of Local Newspapers, Grenda has had the following annual circulation:
2004: 2,912
2005: 2,758
2006: 2,733
2007: 2,622
2008: 2,550
2009: 2,415
2010: 2,376
2011: 2,364
2012: 2,334
2013: 2,308
2014: 2,318
2015: 2,325
2016: 2,387
2017: 2,255
2018: 2,196
2019: 2,246
2020: 2,343
2021: 2,624

References

External links
Grenda home page

Newspapers published in Norway
Norwegian-language newspapers
Mass media in Hordaland
Kvinnherad
Publications established in 1951
1951 establishments in Norway
Nynorsk